Take a Deep Breath may refer to:

 Take a Deep Breath (film), a 2004 Serbian film
 Take a Deep Breath (album), an album by Brighton Rock

See also
Deep breathing, or diaphragmatic breathing